Wahyudi (born on April 4, 1978 in Kediri, East Java) is an Indonesian former footballer.

Club statistics

References

External links

1978 births
Association football goalkeepers
Living people
Indonesian footballers
Liga 1 (Indonesia) players
Deltras F.C. players
Persik Kediri players
Indonesian Premier Division players
Persema Malang players
PSAP Sigli players
People from Kediri (city)
Sportspeople from East Java